Between 1994 and present, Our Lady Peace discography has amounted to twelve total albums. These include ten studio albums, one live album and two compilation albums.

The band has also released 33 singles to date, ranging from "Out of Here" in 1992, to their most recent, "Stop Making Stupid People Famous", in 2021.

Studio albums

Live albums

Compilation albums

Singles

Other appearances
The following songs are non-album tracks released by the band
 "The Needle and the Damage Done" from Borrowed Tunes: A Tribute to Neil Young (1994)
 "Tomorrow Never Knows" from The Craft: Music from the Motion Picture (1996)
 "Starseed" (remix) from Armageddon: The Album (1998)
 "Fight the Good Fight" from Occupy This Album (2012)

Music videos

Notes

A.  "Superman's Dead" and "Clumsy" peaked on the US Radio Songs chart.

References

Discographies of Canadian artists
Rock music group discographies